Big Falls is a populated settlement located in the nation of Belize. It is a mainland village that is located in Toledo District.

Populated places in Toledo District
Toledo West